James Boydell (died January 1860) was a British inventor of steam traction engines. His most significant invention was the first practical track-laying vehicle, for which he received British patents in August 1846 and February 1854.

Description
Boydell described his invention as "endless rails" or an "endless railway wheel", later variations became known as Dreadnaught Wheels. In his system flat boards were attached to a wheel loosely at their centres. As the wheels revolved, they were capable of spreading the weight of an engine over the surface of the board. Boydell worked with the steam traction engine manufacturer Charles Burrell & Sons to produce road haulage engines from 1856 that used his continuous track design.

Boydell Glacier
The United Kingdom Antarctic Place-Names Committee named Boydell Glacier on Trinity Peninsula in northern Graham Land, Antarctica, after him.

See also
 Bramah Joseph Diplock
 Pedrail wheel

Notes

References 
 

British inventors
British steam engine engineers
19th-century British people
1860 deaths
Year of birth unknown